Fauglia is a comune (municipality) in the Province of Pisa in the Italian region Tuscany, located about  southwest of Florence and about  southeast of Pisa.

Geography
Fauglia borders the following municipalities: Collesalvetti, Crespina, Lorenzana, Orciano Pisano.
The town originated as a small medieval burgh around a castle, destroyed by the Florentines in 1433.
Frazioni 
The municipality is formed by the municipal seat of Fauglia and the villages (frazioni) of Acciaiolo, Luciana and Valtriano.

Demographics

Notable civic institutions
The Institutes for the Achievement of Human Potential (IAHP), a United States based nonprofit organization, established a campus in Fauglia in 1992. The IAHP is an educational organization that teaches parents about child brain development and is a treatment center for brain-injured children.

References

External links

 www.comune.fauglia.pi.it/

Cities and towns in Tuscany